Enrique Armando Herrera Huacre is a Peruvian freestyle wrestler. He won the silver medal in the men's 57kg event at the 2022 Bolivarian Games held in Valledupar, Colombia. He won the bronze medal in his event at the 2022 South American Games held in Asunción, Paraguay.

He lost his bronze medal match in his event at the 2022 Pan American Wrestling Championships held in Acapulco, Mexico.

Achievements

References

External links 
 

Living people
Year of birth missing (living people)
Place of birth missing (living people)
Peruvian male sport wrestlers
South American Games medalists in wrestling
South American Games bronze medalists for Peru
Competitors at the 2022 South American Games
21st-century Peruvian people